Rockaholic is the eighth studio album by American rock band Warrant, released on May 17, 2011. This is the first album to feature the band’s third lead singer Robert Mason, who replaced original lead singer Jani Lane in 2008. Lane returned to the band for a 2008 reunion tour but by the end of the year, he and the band parted ways for the second time. Lane had previously replaced former lead singer Jaime St. James, who performed lead vocals on the band's last album, Born Again, and who initially replaced Lane in 2004.

Production and marketing
Warrant began recording Rockaholic in 2009 following the 2008 reunion tour which Robert Mason completed when Jani Lane was unable to complete the tour. The record was produced by Keith Olsen.

Release and promotion
Rockaholic peaked at number 22 on the Billboard Top Hard Rock Albums chart.

The track "Life's a Song" was released as the first single from the album also featuring a music video and the track "Home" was released as the second single with a music video being released in October 2011.

Musical style
Bass player Jerry Dixon commented: "I really think we captured a perfect mix of the past and present on this record. Each song has its own vibe that's going to take people on a kick-ass Warrant ride [...] There's enough 80's influence on songs like "Tears in the City" and "Sex Ain't Love" to keep the die-hard Warrant fans rocking while introducing them to new material."

Tour
The Rockaholic Tour of Canada and the US with label mates Whitesnake as well as Cinderella and Poison, had Warrant playing over 50 dates in support of the album.

Track listing
 "Sex Ain't Love" (Dixon, Mason, Turner) - 3:57
 "Innocence Gone" (Dixon, Mason) - 3:40
 "Snake" (Mason) - 3:44
 "Dusty's Revenge" (Dixon, Mason, Turner) - 4:26
 "Home" (Mason) - 3:27
 "What Love Can Do" (Dixon) - 4:19
 "Life's a Song" (Dixon) - 4:09
 "Show Must Go On" (Dixon, Mason) - 2:48
 "Cocaine Freight Train" (Dixon, Mason) - 2:57
 "Found Forever" (Mason) - 4:14
 "Candy Man" (Dixon, Turner) - 4:04
 "Sunshine" (Dixon, Mason, Duncan) - 3:53
 "Tears in the City" (Dixon) - 3:34
 "The Last Straw" (Dixon, Mason, Turner) - 4:12

Personnel
Robert Mason - Lead vocals
Joey Allen - Lead guitar, Backing vocals
Erik Turner - Rhythm guitar, Backing vocals
Jerry Dixon - Bass, Backing vocals
Steven Sweet - Drums, Backing vocals

Charts

References

External links
 Warrant Official Site
 Classic Warrant Videos on Sony BMG MusicBox

Warrant (American band) albums
2011 albums
Albums produced by Keith Olsen
Frontiers Records albums